Muhammet Taha Tepe (born 1 January 2001) is a Turkish professional footballer who plays as a goalkeeper for Trabzonspor.

Club career
Born in Sakarya, Tepe was trained in the youth academies of Sapanca Akademi Spor and Sakaryaspor before joining Altınordu in 2014. He was included in The Guardian's "Next Generation 2018", highlighting the best young players worldwide. After progressing through the youth ranks at Altınordu, he was loaned to 2. Lig side Niğde Anadolu for the 2019–20 season.

In June 2020, Tepe joined Süper Lig side Trabzonspor on a five-year contract. He was loaned to the 2. Lig again in January 2021, this time with Turgutluspor.

Career statistics

Club

Notes

Honours
Trabzonspor
 Süper Lig: 2021–22
 Turkish Super Cup: 2022

References

2001 births
Living people
People from Sakarya Province
Turkish footballers
Turkey youth international footballers
Association football goalkeepers
TFF Second League players
Sakaryaspor footballers
Altınordu F.K. players
Niğde Anadolu FK footballers
Trabzonspor footballers
Turgutluspor footballers